Kalibum of Kish was the seventh Sumerian king in the First Dynasty of Kish, according to the Sumerian king list. This name is written "Ga-lí-bu-um ... normalized as Kalibum", and is believed to be derived from the Akkadian for 'hound'. Kalibum is unlikely to have existed as his name does not appear on texts dating from the period in which he was presumed to have lived (Early Dynastic period).

References

|-

Kings of Kish
Sumerian kings